The 2008 KB První Liga Competition was a Czech domestic rugby club competition, operated by the Česká Rugbyová Unie (ČSRU). It began on August 31, 2008 with a match between Olomouc and ARC Iuridica, and ended with the final on 18 October of that year with Bystrc beating Olomouc 31-10.

Unlike most other years, the league was played over the course of only one year.

Schedule and results
From the official ČSRU site. Within each weekend, matches are to be listed in the following order:
 By date.
 If matches are held on the same day, by kickoff time.
 Otherwise, in alphabetic order of home club.

Rounds 1 to 5
Round 1
 31 August, — Olomouc 24 - 0 ARC Iuridica
 31 August, — Bystrc 58 - 5 Slavia Prague B
 4 October, — Sokol Mariánské Hory 23 - 10 Zlín

Round 2
 7 September, — ARC Iuridica 0 - 48 Zlín
 7 September, — Slavia Prague B 12 - 32 Sokol Mariánské Hory
 7 September, — Olomouc 8 - 49 Bystrc

Round 3
 13 September, 14:00 — Sokol Mariánské Hory 0 - 14 Olomouc
 14 September, 14:00 — Bystrc 30 - 0 ARC Iuridica
 14 September, 14:00 — Zlín 63 - 5 Slavia Prague B

Round 4
 20 September, 14:00 — Bystrc 30 - 0 Sokol Mariánské Hory
 21 September, 16:30 — ARC Iuridica 30 - 0 Slavia Prague B
 21 September, 17:00 — Olomouc 68 - 0 Zlín

Round 5
 27 September, 14:00 — Zlín 3 - 17 Bystrc
 28 September, 14:00 — Sokol Mariánské Hory 85 - 8 ARC Iuridica
 28 September, 15:00 — Slavia Prague B 12 - 37 Olomouc

Semi-finals

Final

Match details

References

2008
2008–09 in Czech rugby union